Welcome to Earth is a television program that follows actor Will Smith, as he sets out to offer an insight into some of the world's most remote and uncharted locations. The program debuted as a Disney+ Original on the 8th December 2021, under the National Geographic banner, with all six episodes airing at once.

Premise 
Will Smith is guided by experienced National Geographic Explorers, traveling to places such as remote islands in the Pacific, to the Namib Desert.

Production 
After filming One Strange Rock, National Geographic suggested Will Smith to become the narrator of a new television program. Welcome to Earth was filmed during the Covid-19 pandemic. The program was produced for Disney+ by Nutopia, Westbrook Studios and Protozoa Pictures.

Episodes

Season 1 (2021)

Release 
The program premiered on Disney+ on December 8, 2021.

Reception

Critical response 
On the review aggregator Rotten Tomatoes, the first season of the program holds an approval rating of 100%, based on 9 reviews, with an average rating of 7.00/10. Metacritic, which uses a weighted average, assigned the film a score of 63 out of 100 based on 50 critics, indicating "generally favorable reviews."

Accolades

References

External links 
 

2021 American television series debuts
Disney+ original programming
Television shows filmed in Vanuatu
Television shows filmed in the Bahamas
Television shows filmed in Tanzania
Television shows filmed in Australia
Television shows filmed in Namibia
Television shows filmed in Iceland